Faithfully is a 2012 Philippine television drama series broadcast by GMA Network. Directed by Mike Tuviera, it stars Maxene Magalona, Michelle Madrigal, Isabel Oli, Vaness del Moral and Isabelle Daza. It premiered on June 18, 2012 on the network's Afternoon Prime line up replacing Broken Vow. The series concluded on October 5, 2012 with a total of 80 episodes. It was replaced by Magdalena in its timeslot.

Cast and characters

Lead cast
 Maxene Magalona as Stella Mariano-Quillamor/Escanio
 Michelle Madrigal as Luchie Trajano-Quillamor
 Isabel Oli as Megan Briones
 Isabelle Daza as Misha Villar
 Vaness del Moral as Dina Carvajal

Supporting cast
 Mike Tan as Perry Escanio
 Marc Abaya as Kevin Quillamor
 Will Devaughn as Luke Gallanosa
 Kevin Santos as Edjie Miranda
 Victor Aliwalas as Dan Belmonte
 Chanda Romero as Amanda Quillamor
 Timmy Cruz as Gloria Mariano
 Miggs Cuaderno as Miggy Quillamor
 Diva Montelaba as Osang
 Jamaica Olivera as Shelby Quillamor
 Rez Cortez as Fidel Mariano / Fidel Saavedra 
 Bing Davao as Charles Quillamor
 Say Alonzo as Carmina Escanio

Ratings
According to AGB Nielsen Philippines' Mega Manila household television ratings, the pilot episode of Faithfully earned a 14.6% rating. While the final episode scored a 23.1% rating.

References

External links
 

2012 Philippine television series debuts
2012 Philippine television series endings
Filipino-language television shows
GMA Network drama series
Television shows set in Manila